The Chuxi Tulou cluster is a group of earthen structures or "tulou" dating to the Ming Dynasty (13681644). The group provides a tourist attraction in the town of Xiayang, Yongding County, Longyan, Fujian Province, China.

History
Chuxi Tulou cluster is a Hakka village inhabited by Xu clan, who settled down in the 14th century. The first tulou was Heqing Lou, which was the ancestry tulou of the village. After that, all tulous built in the village were named with a Chinese character qing, with a wish of having a flourishing population. Chuxi tulou group was designated as UNESCO World Heritage site as part of Fujian Tulou in 2008.

Structures
A total of 36 tulous are conserved in Chuxi village. The largest and also the oldest in the cluster is Jiqing Lou, built in 1419 during the reign of the Yongle Emperor of the Ming dynasty. It consists of two concentric rings, the outer ring building is four stories tall, with 53 rooms on each level. The outer ring contains 72 stairs split into 72 units interfacing each other. The second ring is a one-story building.

Famous tulou
Ten tulous were listed in the UNESCO World Heritage site.

Trivia
The CIA once believed that Chuxi Tulou were missile bases due to their size and shape in the 1960s.

Gallery

References 

Buildings and structures in Fujian
Tourist attractions in Fujian
Hakka architecture